Aberdeen City Centre Masterplan is a project by Aberdeen City Council which aims to improve the city of Aberdeen.

History
In March 2015, the first details on the project were released, and initial public consultations opened. The proposals were designed by BDP and priced at £280 million in 2015. The project was approved by councillors on 24 June 2015. In November 2016, it was announced that the council had raised £307 million through issuing public bonds, and that this would go towards the funding of the masterplan, the P&J Live, and other infrastructure projects.

Proposals 
The initial proposals included the partial pedestrianisation of Union Street and a "station gateway", creating a pedestrian link between Union Street and Aberdeen railway station. Proposals announced in 2016 included a new area called Queen's Square, created through the demolition of the police headquarters on Queen Street.

References

Aberdeen